7U  or 7-U' may refer to:

7U. IATA code for Aviaenergo
Ciroën 7U
HT-7U, internal designation for  EAST
One of the possible sizes of a rack unit, 10.50-inches (266.70mm) nominal. See rack mount.
P2V-7U, a model of  Lockheed P-2 Neptune
Su-7U, a model of Sukhoi Su-7
Yak-7U, a model of Yakovlev Yak-7
I-7U, a model of Mikoyan-Gurevich I-75
Type 7U, a model of  Gnevny class destroyer

See also
U7 (disambiguation)